is an athletic stadium in Shizuoka, Shizuoka, Japan. It is part of the Kusanagi Sport Complex, which includes Kusanagi Baseball Stadium, Konohana Arena, and others.

The stadium comprises the Main Stand of 8000 seats, with grass banking on the remaining three sides. The Back Stand opposite the Main Stand can accommodate 12000, with the remaining ends 4000 each.

Football usage

In addition to athletics, the stadium has been utilised for matches by J.League football teams Shimizu S-Pulse, Júbilo Iwata and Fujieda MYFC. 

Shimizu S-Pulse used the ground extensively in the 1990s, largely sharing home stadium duties with Nihondaira Stadium at the dawn of the J.League in 1992. S-Pulse called Kusanagi home while Nihondaira was being expanded in 1994, and its pitch re-laid in 2003. However, Shimizu have not used the stadium for competitive games since 2003.

External links
 Kusanagi Sport Complex official website

Shimizu S-Pulse
Football venues in Japan
Sports venues in Shizuoka Prefecture
Buildings and structures in Shizuoka (city)
Sports venues completed in 1957
1957 establishments in Japan